Continuum is an album by German keyboardist and composer Rainer Brüninghaus with trumpeter Markus Stockhausen and drummer Fredy Studer recorded in 1983 and released on the ECM label.

Reception

In the Allmusic review by Thom Jurek, he calls the album "meditative, inviting, full of rounded edges and melodies. It contains all the icy spaciousness of Manfred Eicher's trademark production, but the effect of Brüninghaus' compositions is warm, accessible even. They are open-ended and contemplative and explore musical questions lyrically. There is a valid argument to be made for the non-adventurousness of these works, and the fairly safe improvisations within them, but perhaps that's the point".

Track listing
All compositions by Rainer Brüninghaus
 "Strahlenspur" - 4:50   
 "Stille" - 10:27   
 "Continuum" - 4:00   
 "Raga Rag" - 10:49   
 "Schattenfrei" - 5:15   
 "Innerfern" - 9:30  
Recorded at Talent Studio in Oslo, Norway in September 1983

Personnel
Rainer Brüninghaus - piano, synthesizer
Markus Stockhausen - trumpet, flugelhorn
Fredy Studer - drums

References

ECM Records albums
1984 albums
Albums produced by Manfred Eicher